Thiery Camille (11 December 2001 in Victoria) is a Seychellois association footballer currently playing for Saint John Bosco of the Seychelles First Division, and the Seychelles national team.

Club career
Camille has played for Saint John Bosco of the Seychelles First Division since at least 2018. For the 2019–2020 season, he went on loan to Au Cap FC.

International career
In 2019 Camille was part of the Seychelle's squad that competed in the 2019 COSAFA U-20 Cup. He was called up to the senior squad in November 2021 for the 2021 Four Nations Football Tournament. He went on to make his senior international debut on 19 November 2021 against Sri Lanka in the final. At 18-years-old, Camille was the youngest member of the squad which went on to win the competition.

International career statistics

References

External links

2001 births
Living people
Association football forwards
Seychellois footballers
Seychelles international footballers